Lila Zali Levienne (July 22, 1918January 4, 2003) was an American prima ballerina and ballet director. She founded the Ballet Pacifica in Orange County, California, serving as its choreographer and artistic director from 1962 to 1988.

Early life
Zali was born Elisaveta Borisova Zalipskaya in Tbilisi, Georgia, the daughter of an operatic tenor. In 1922, while a young child, Zali and her family emigrated from Russia to Washington, DC in the USA following the 1917 Russian Revolution.

Career
After graduating from the School of American Ballet in 1938, Zali became a minor soloist for Mikhail Mordkin's ballet company (now the American Ballet Theatre). She then danced for Colonel de Basil's Ballets Russes but left when her mother refused permission for her to tour with the company in South America. During the summer of 1944, Zali performed regularly on the CBS television show Balleretta. She also appeared on the Colgate Comedy Hour. In 1945, she moved to Hollywood where appeared in films including Limelight, Anything Goes and Silk Stockings; and was the dance double for Leslie Caron in Gigi, Gaby and An American in Paris. Zali also continued stage performances, dancing prima ballerina for the Los Angeles City Ballet and the Coronet Ballet.

Zali became an instructor at the Los Angeles dance studios of Adolph Bolm and then Michel Panaieff, where one of her students was young Cynthia Gregory.

Following a move to Laguna Beach, California, Zali in 1962 established the Laguna Beach Civic Ballet dance company (later renamed the Ballet Pacifica). She served, without salary, as its director and choreographer until 1988. After choosing a successor, Zali continued as the company's artistic advisor and taught classes until her death at the age of 84.

Zali was a member of the board of directors of Regional Dance America (previously the National Association of Regional Ballet) and served as its president (1994–1996).

Personal life
In 1945, Zali married the cellist, Nicholas "Kolia" Levienne, who founded the Laguna Beach Chamber Music Society. Zali died of natural causes in Laguna Beach, California in 2003. She is buried at Pacific View Memorial Park in Corona del Mar.

Filmography

References

Further reading
 Who's Who of American Women. 15th edition, 1987–1988. Wilmette, IL: Marquis Who's Who, 1986.

External links
 

1918 births
2003 deaths
American ballerinas
American Ballet Theatre dancers
American theatre directors
Women theatre directors
Ballerinas from Georgia (country)
Burials at Pacific View Memorial Park
People from Laguna Beach, California
Female dancers from Tbilisi
Prima ballerinas
White Russian emigrants to the United States
20th-century American ballet dancers